Paul Richard Sarringhaus (August 13, 1920 – April 7, 1998) was an American football halfback who played two seasons in the National Football League with the Chicago Cardinals and Detroit Lions. He was drafted by the Philadelphia Eagles in the ninth round of the 1944 NFL Draft. He played college football at Ohio State University and attended Hamilton High School in Hamilton, Ohio.

References
Life magazine cover Oct 22,1945

External links
Just Sports Stats
 

1920 births
1998 deaths
Players of American football from Ohio
American football halfbacks
Ohio State Buckeyes football players
Chicago Cardinals players
Detroit Lions players
Sportspeople from Hamilton, Ohio
Wilmington Clippers players